Laaxersee or Lag Grond is a lake in the village of Laax, Grisons, Switzerland.

Fishing season is from May 1 to September 15. In winter, the lake is generally frozen.

External links
  
  

Lakes of Switzerland
Lakes of Graubünden
LLaaxersee
Laax